William James F. Croxon (1871–1949) was an English footballer who played in The Football League for Sheffield United and Rotherham Town. Born in West Ham he played as an outside right and also had spells at Royal Arsenal and Millwall. Signed by United in the autumn of 1892, Croxon struggled to break into the first team as they played their first season in the Football League. He made his league debut in November 1892 in a game against Darwen, but played only three further league games in his two-year spell. Croxon moved to Rotherham Town in the summer of 1894, for whom he played nine league games before retiring.

In later life Croxon worked as a clerk in a Sheffield school and played cricket for Shiregreen.

Honours
Sheffield United
Football League Division Two
Runner-up: 1892–93

References

Footballers from West Ham
1871 births
1949 deaths
English footballers
Association football midfielders
English Football League players
Arsenal F.C. players
Millwall F.C. players
Sheffield United F.C. players
Rotherham Town F.C. (1878) players
Northern Football League players